The Opera House Hotel is a boutique hotel located in South Bronx of the Bronx, New York City. It was converted from the former Bronx Opera House, which was designed by George M. Keister and built in 1913.

The hotel opened in August 2013 and is one of eight hotel properties owned and operated by the Empire Hotel Group.  The hotel is the first of several boutique hotels which have opened or are being constructed in the Bronx.

The New York City Legionnaires' disease outbreak were reported to had emerged following the discovery of the legionella bacteria at the hotel.

References

External links

 Official website

Hotels in the Bronx
Hotel buildings completed in 2013